Dohonna Malik Scott (born October 16, 1980) is an American boxing trainer and former professional boxer who competed from 2000 to 2016.

Amateur career
Scott started boxing at the age of 11 and had a stellar amateur career.  In 1997, he won the Junior Olympics Championships and in 1998, Scott won the American Boxing Classic title and the "Under-19" Junior World Championships crown.

He won the National AAU Heavyweight Championship in 1999 defeating world champ Michael Bennett and Jason Estrada in the process.
In 2000 he beat DaVarryl Williamson and Malcolm Tann but lost to Estrada at the trials and then Bennett in the Olympic box-offs and therefore did not qualify.
His record was 70–3.

Professional career
Scott turned professional in 2000 and has only three defeats to his name. His wins include former amateur star Terry McGroom and journeymen David Bostice and Louis Monaco, he took a big step up in early 2007 and defeated former contender Charles Shufford.

He did not fight between December 2008 and the beginning of 2012, due to a bicep injury. He has since recovered from the injury and made a comeback in early 2012.
Scott was under the tuition of boxing Hall of Fame trainer Jesse Reid until 2014 when the pair split because Scott believed Father Time was catching up with Reid, Scott then reunited with his former amateur coach, Fred Jenkins. Scott is promoted by Goossen-Tutor. Scott was scheduled to fight on the Paul Williams vs. Nobuhiro Ishida undercard at the American Bank Center, Corpus Christi, Texas. The fight took place on February 18, 2012. The opponent was heavyweight journeyman Kendrick Releford.
It marked Scott's first return to the boxing ring, more than three years after his last fight. It was the second time Scott faced Releford in his career, as they fought back in January 2006. As the case for their first fight, Scott won by unanimous decision.

Scott's second fight in 2012 was on June 23, 2012 at Sportsmen's Lodge, Studio City, California. He faced off against the Mexican heavyweight boxer, Alvaro Morales. Scott won by a unanimous decision. He won by 60–54 on all three scorecards.
Scott then fought on the undercard of Andre Ward vs. Chad Dawson on September 8, 2012 at the Oracle Arena, Oakland, California. It was against Tongan heavyweight contender Bowie Tupou. Scott won the fight by an 8-round TKO.

On January 10, 2013 it was announced that Scott would face off against unbeaten heavyweight contender Vyacheslav Glazkov. The fight took place on February 23, 2013 and ended in a draw, the first blemish on Scott's record. On July 20, 2013 Scott fought Derek Chisora for the vacant WBO International Heavyweight title. The fight took place at the Wembley Arena in London, England and Scott suffered his first defeat, a sixth round knockout. Having been floored, he waited until the referee counted to nine to get up, but was adjudged to have been counted out in the act of rising.

On January 24, 2014 Scott beat Grover Young by a stoppage in the second round, before getting knocked out in the first round by Deontay Wilder on March 15, 2014. There was speculation that Scott had taken a dive against Wilder, but Scott denied this.

In his next fight, Scott fought Alex Leapai. Scott secured the win via unanimous decision, winning 100-90, 99-91 and 98-92 on the scorecards.

Scott then fought crafty southpaw veteran and somewhat of a gatekeeper, Tony Thompson, on October 30, 2015. The fight was scheduled for ten rounds and Scott went on to win the fight via unanimous decision despite being knocked down in the ninth round.

On November 12, 2016 he fought Cuban boxer Luis Ortiz in Monaco. Despite claiming to have a perfect camp, the bout was largely uneventful and disappointing. Scott was on the backfoot for most of the fight and seemed completely unwilling to engage with Ortiz. British commentator Adam Smith lamented the bout as "the worst I have seen in many years". Matchroom promoter Eddie Hearn was also visibly disappointed after the bout and claimed that "Scott didn't do us any favors tonight". The official scorecards were 120–105, 120–106, and 119–106 all in favor of Ortiz.

Life after boxing 
Scott became the new head coach for Deontay Wilder in 2021. Their first fight working together was Wilder's eleventh-round knockout loss in his trilogy fight against undefeated WBC and The Ring champion Tyson Fury, the latter of whom Scott had previously sparred with, when Scott had his eardrum busted by Fury.

Professional boxing record

{|class="wikitable" style="text-align:center"
|-
!
!Result
!Record
!Opponent
!Type
!Round, time
!Date
!Location
!Notes
|-
|42
|Loss
|38–3–1
|style="text-align:left;"|Luis Ortiz
|UD
|12
|Nov 12, 2016
|style="text-align:left;"|
|style="text-align:left;"|
|-
|41
|Win
|38–2–1
|style="text-align:left;"|Tony Thompson
|UD
|10
|Oct 30, 2015
|style="text-align:left;"|
|
|-
|40
|Win
|37–2–1
|style="text-align:left;"|Alex Leapai
|UD
|10
|Oct 31, 2014
|style="text-align:left;"|
|
|-
|39
|Loss
|36–2–1
|style="text-align:left;"|Deontay Wilder
|KO
|1 (12), 
|Mar 15, 2014
|style="text-align:left;"|
|
|-
|38
|Win
|36–1–1
|style="text-align:left;"|Grover Young
|TKO
|2 (6), 
|Jan 24, 2014
|style="text-align:left;"|
|
|-
|37
|Loss
|35–1–1
|style="text-align:left;"|Derek Chisora
|TKO
|6 (10), 
|Jul 20, 2013
|style="text-align:left;"|
|style="text-align:left;"|
|-
|36
|Draw
|35–0–1
|style="text-align:left;"|Vyacheslav Glazkov
|SD
|10
|Feb 23, 2013
|style="text-align:left;"|
|
|-
|35
|Win
|35–0
|style="text-align:left;"|Bowie Tupou
|TKO
|8 (8), 
|Sep 8, 2012
|style="text-align:left;"|
|
|-
|34
|Win
|34–0
|style="text-align:left;"|Alvaro Morales
|UD
|6
|Jun 23, 2012
|style="text-align:left;"|
|
|-
|33
|Win
|33–0
|style="text-align:left;"|Kendrick Releford
|UD
|8
|Feb 18, 2012
|style="text-align:left;"|
|
|-
|32
|Win
|32–0
|style="text-align:left;"|Raphael Butler
|UD
|8
|Dec 13, 2008
|style="text-align:left;"|
|
|-
|31
|Win
|31–0
|style="text-align:left;"|Arthur Cook
|TKO
|7 (8), 
|Jul 18, 2008
|style="text-align:left;"|
|
|-
|30
|Win
|30–0
|style="text-align:left;"|Damian Norris
|UD
|10
|Dec 11, 2007
|style="text-align:left;"|
|
|-
|29
|Win
|29–0
|style="text-align:left;"|Sedreck Fields
|UD
|4
|Jul 20, 2007
|style="text-align:left;"|
|
|-
|28
|Win
|28–0
|style="text-align:left;"|Charles Shufford
|UD
|10
|May 4, 2007
|style="text-align:left;"|
|
|-
|27
|Win
|27–0
|style="text-align:left;"|Ramon Hayes
|UD
|8
|Feb 22, 2007
|style="text-align:left;"|
|
|-
|26
|Win
|26–0
|style="text-align:left;"|Andrew Greeley
|UD
|8
|Dec 14, 2006
|style="text-align:left;"|
|
|-
|25
|Win
|25–0
|style="text-align:left;"|Marcus McGee
|UD
|8
|Jul 22, 2006
|style="text-align:left;"|
|
|-
|24
|Win
|24–0
|style="text-align:left;"|Kendrick Releford
|UD
|8
|Jan 28, 2006
|style="text-align:left;"|
|
|-
|23
|Win
|23–0
|style="text-align:left;"|Dennis McKinney
|UD
|6
|Nov 19, 2005
|style="text-align:left;"|
|
|-
|22
|Win
|22–0
|style="text-align:left;"|Shane Swartz
|UD
|8
|Apr 23, 2005
|style="text-align:left;"|
|
|-
|21
|Win
|21–0
|style="text-align:left;"|David Bostice
|UD
|8
|Jan 29, 2005
|style="text-align:left;"|
|
|-
|20
|Win
|20–0
|style="text-align:left;"|Louis Monaco
|UD
|8
|Nov 4, 2004
|style="text-align:left;"|
|
|-
|19
|Win
|19–0
|style="text-align:left;"|Drexie James
|KO
|1 (6), 
|Aug 6, 2004
|style="text-align:left;"|
|
|-
|18
|Win
|18–0
|style="text-align:left;"|Carlton Johnson
|UD
|8
|Jul 26, 2003
|style="text-align:left;"|
|
|-
|17
|Win
|17–0
|style="text-align:left;"|Otis Tisdale
|UD
|8
|Jun 7, 2003
|style="text-align:left;"|
|
|-
|16
|Win
|16–0
|style="text-align:left;"|Onebo Maxime
|UD
|6
|Apr 4, 2003
|style="text-align:left;"|
|
|-
|15
|Win
|15–0
|style="text-align:left;"|Terry McGroom
|TKO
|2 (8), 
|Feb 1, 2003
|style="text-align:left;"|
|
|-
|14
|Win
|14–0
|style="text-align:left;"|Ken Murphy
|UD
|8
|Oct 19, 2002
|style="text-align:left;"|
|
|-
|13
|Win
|13–0
|style="text-align:left;"|Bryan Blakely
|TKO
|1 (8), 
|Aug 24, 2002
|style="text-align:left;"|
|
|-
|12
|Win
|12–0
|style="text-align:left;"|Lyle McDowell
|
|7 (8), 
|Jul 13, 2002
|style="text-align:left;"|
|
|-
|11
|Win
|11–0
|style="text-align:left;"|Dan Ward
|UD
|8
|Jun 8, 2002
|style="text-align:left;"|
|
|-
|10
|Win
|10–0
|style="text-align:left;"|Britton Thomas
|
|1 (8), 
|Apr 27, 2002
|style="text-align:left;"|
|
|-
|9
|Win
|9–0
|style="text-align:left;"|Curtis Taylor
|TKO
|3 (8)
|Mar 16, 2002
|style="text-align:left;"|
|
|-
|8
|Win
|8–0
|style="text-align:left;"|Ramon Hayes
|UD
|6
|Feb 2, 2002
|style="text-align:left;"|
|
|-
|7
|Win
|7–0
|style="text-align:left;"|Louis Monaco
|
|6
|Oct 13, 2001
|style="text-align:left;"|
|
|-
|6
|Win
|6–0
|style="text-align:left;"|Ron Brown
|TKO
|2 (6), 
|Aug 18, 2001
|style="text-align:left;"|
|
|-
|5
|Win
|5–0
|style="text-align:left;"|Tracy Williams
|UD
|4
|Jun 15, 2001
|style="text-align:left;"|
|
|-
|4
|Win
|4–0
|style="text-align:left;"|Robert Anderson
|TKO
|2 (4), 
|May 19, 2001
|style="text-align:left;"|
|
|-
|3
|Win
|3–0
|style="text-align:left;"|Maurice Wheeler
|
|4
|Mar 16, 2001
|style="text-align:left;"|
|
|-
|2
|Win
|2–0
|style="text-align:left;"|Jackie Beard
|TKO
|3 (4)
|Feb 2, 2001
|style="text-align:left;"|
|
|-
|1
|Win
|1–0
|style="text-align:left;"|Tony Foster
|
|2 (4), 
|Nov 10, 2000
|style="text-align:left;"|
|

Exhibition boxing record

References

External links
 
 M alik Scott - Profile, News Archive & Current Rankings at Box.Live

1980 births
Living people
African-American boxers
Boxers from Philadelphia
Winners of the United States Championship for amateur boxers
American male boxers
Heavyweight boxers
21st-century African-American sportspeople
20th-century African-American people